Cyperus eboracensis is a species of sedge that is native to Queensland in north eastern Australia.

See also 
 List of Cyperus species

References 

eboracensis
Plants described in 2009
Flora of Queensland